Etox is the first Turkish automobile manufacturer dedicated exclusively to building sports cars. The company is based in Ankara, Turkey. Its first model, the Etox Zafer, is the second Turkish sports car after the Anadol STC-16, which was produced from 1973 to 1975.

Prototype
Designing the Etox Zafer took 6 months after testing and surveying among hundreds of prototypes. The latest prototype was created by 46 Turkish engineers in 2 years. The 100,000 kilometer quality tests of the Etox Zafer were completed in 2007.

Mass production
The license for mass production of the Etox Zafer was granted by the Turkish Government in 2007. The Zafer is to be assembled in Turkey, with engines built by French, German and Swedish auto manufacturers, though Etox plans to develop its own engines in the near future. The 1.5 liter diesel engine which produces  is a Renault engine with slight ECU modifications; the 3.0 liter diesel engine which produces  is a BMW engine; while the 3.0 liter gasoline engine which produces  is a Volvo engine. Apart from the three standard engines, a  engine is also available for special orders.

The Etox Zafer costs between 85,000 and 150,000 TL (10,000 and 18,000 USD) depending on the model and engine type.

Official introduction of Etox Zafer

The first official introduction of Etox Zafer took place on 30 August 2007. August the 30th is the Zafer Bayramı (Victory Day) in Turkey (the word Zafer means Victory in Turkish).

Technical specifications

Dimensions
 Length: 4215 mm
 Width: 1980 mm
 Height: 1290 mm
 Axle distance: 2575 mm
 Front trace gap: 1700 mm
 Rear trace gap: 1698 mm

Engines

Etox Zafer is powered by 3 standard engines, and 1 optional engine:

 1.5 litre,  diesel engine (standard production)
 3.0 litre,  diesel engine (standard production)
 3.0 litre V6,  gasoline engine (standard production)
  engine (optional)

References

External links
 Official website of Etox

Vehicle manufacturing companies established in 2006
Manufacturing companies based in Ankara
Cars of Turkey
Car manufacturers of Turkey
Turkish brands
2006 establishments in Turkey